Wolfgang Preiss (27 February 1910 – 27 November 2002) was a German theatre, film and television actor.

The son of a teacher, Preiss studied philosophy, German, and drama in the early 1930s. He also took private acting classes with Hans Schlenck, making his stage début in Munich in 1932. He appeared in various theatre productions in Heidelberg, Königsberg, Bonn, Bremen, Stuttgart and Berlin.

In 1942, he made his film début – he was specifically exempted from military service – in the UFA production Die grosse Liebe with  Zarah Leander. After the end of the Second World War, Preiss returned to the theatre, and from 1949 worked extensively dubbing films into German.

In 1954, he returned to film acting, appearing in Alfred Weidenmann's Canaris. The following year, Preiss played the lead role of Claus von Stauffenberg in Falk Harnack's film The Plot to Assassinate Hitler, which dramatised the 20 July plot. This role brought Preiss to popular attention and also the 1956 Federal Film Award.

From then on, Preiss was largely typecast in the role of the upright and obligation-conscious German officer to the other A-list actor playing the fanatic (i.e. Paul Scofield in The Train), a part he played in many films, later reprising it in numerous international productions, predominantly in Italy and the USA, while occasionally playing a more typically cynical or brutal Nazi officer.

Preiss appeared in such productions as The Longest Day (1962), Otto Preminger's The Cardinal  (1963), and with Jean-Paul Belmondo in Is Paris Burning? (1966). He starred alongside Burt Lancaster in John Frankenheimer's The Train (1964), Frank Sinatra in Von Ryan's Express (1965), Robert Mitchum in Anzio (1968), with Richard Burton, in the title role of  Erwin Rommel in Raid on Rommel (1971), and The Boys From Brazil (1978) with Gregory Peck. Preiss played Field Marshal Von Rundstedt in Richard Attenborough's all-star war epic A Bridge Too Far (1977). From 1968–1988 he played in American film and television productions five different German field marshals, having already played a fictional Afrika Korps general in an episode of The Rat Patrol (1966).

In addition, for the cinema-going public of West Germany, he became the epitome of the evil genius in his role as Doctor Mabuse, a role he first played in 1960 (following Rudolf Klein-Rogge) in Fritz Lang's The Thousand Eyes of Dr. Mabuse. He went on to play the role four more times.

In the 1980s, Preiss turned to television, notably playing General Walther von Brauchitsch in the American TV miniseries Winds of War and War and Remembrance, based on the books of Herman Wouk.

In 1987, Preiss received a second Federal Film Award for his outstanding work in film.

In film dubbing, Preiss provided the voice for such actors as Lex Barker, Christopher Lee, Anthony Quinn, Claude Rains, Richard Widmark and Conrad Veidt as "Major Strasser" in the 1975 remastered version of Casablanca.

Selected filmography

 The Great Love (1942) as Oberleutnant Von Etzdorf
 The Crew of the Dora (1943) as Staffelarzt Dr. Wagner
 Falschmünzer am Werk (1951) 
 Canaris (1954) as Col. Holl
 Doctor Solm (1955) as Dr. Hartung
 The Plot to Assassinate Hitler (1955) as Oberst Claus Schenk Graf von Stauffenberg
 The Cornet (1955) as Freiherr von Pirovano
 Before Sundown (1956) as Dr. Hahnefeld, Syndikus der Clausen-Werke
 Like Once Lili Marleen (1956) as Alfred Linder
 The Story of Anastasia (1956)
 Johannisnacht (1956) as Mac Fadden
  (1957) as Mario Clar, Konstrukteur
 Stresemann (1957) as Heinz Becker
  (1957) as U-Bootkommandant Lüttke
 I Was All His (1958) as Dr. Leipold
 The Italians They Are Crazy (1958) as Hans
 The Green Devils of Monte Cassino (1958) as Munkler
  (1958) as Kriminalkommissar Dr. Jäger
  (1958) as Carlo Gormann
 Prisoner of the Volga (1959) as General Gorew
 Stalingrad: Dogs, Do You Want to Live Forever? (1959) as Major Linkmann
 La Valse du Gorille (1959) as Otto Lohn
  (1959) as Dr. Westorp
 Roses for the Prosecutor (1959) as Prosecutor General
 Darkness Fell on Gotenhafen (1960) as Dr. Beck
 Mistress of the World (1960) as Brandes
 The Thousand Eyes of Dr. Mabuse (1960) as Prof. Dr. S. Jordan / Peter Cornelius / Dr. Mabuse
 Mill of the Stone Women (1960) as Dr. Loren Bohlem
  (1961) as Günther Brandt
 La Fayette (1961) as Baron Kalb
 The Return of Doctor Mabuse (1961) as Dr. Mabuse
  (1961) as Arthur Dahlberg
 Das Mädchen und der Staatsanwalt (1962) as Prosecutor Soldan
  (1962) as Dr. Primarius Krone / Dr. Mabuse
 The Counterfeit Traitor (1962) as Colonel Nordoff
 Das Testament des Dr. Mabuse (1962) as Dr. Mabuse
 The Longest Day (1962) as Maj. Gen. Max Pemsel
 The Black Cobra (1963) as Stanislas Raskin
 Scotland Yard Hunts Dr. Mabuse (1963) as Dr. Mabuse's Ghost
  (1963) as Inspector Morel Smith
 The Cardinal (1963) as S.S. Major
 The Secret of Dr. Mabuse (1964) as Dr. Mabuse (archive footage)
 Cave of the Living Dead (1964) as Prof. von Adelsberg
  (1964) as Prosecutor Ted Talbot
 Backfire (1964) as Grenner
 The Train (1964) as Major Herren
 100 Horsemen (1964) as Sheik abengalbon
 Von Ryan's Express (1965) as Major Von Klemment
 Code Name: Jaguar (1965) as Captain Parker
 To Skin a Spy (1966) as Chalieff
 Is Paris Burning? (1966) as Capitaine Ebernach
 Jungfrau aus zweiter Hand (1967) as Leiter der Mordkommission
 Spy Today, Die Tomorrow (1967) as Sebastian (BND Chief)
 Dead Run (1967) as Inspector Noland
 Death on a Rainy Day (1967) as Dr. Angus Cromwell
 Jack of Diamonds (1967) as Von Schenk
 Tamara (1968) as Vater Bricks
 Anzio (1968)  as Field Marshal Albert Kesselring
 Hannibal Brooks (1969) as Col. von Haller
 Battle of the Commandos (1969) as Col. Ackerman
 Playgirl 70 (1969)
 Raid on Rommel (1971) as Erwin Rommel
 The Fifth Cord (1971) as Police Inspector
 Una farfalla con le ali insanguinate (1971) as Prosecutor
 The Salzburg Connection (1972) as Felix Zauner
 The Master Touch (1972) as Miller
 The Big Delirium (1975) as Artmann
 Die Dubarry (1975) as Graf Dubarry
 The Standard (1977) as Oberst
 A Bridge Too Far (1977) as Field Marshal Gerd von Rundstedt
 The Boys from Brazil (1978) as Lofquist
 Die Anstalt (1978) as Dr. Reinecke
 Bloodline (1979) as Julius Prager
 The Formula (1980) as Franz Tauber, Swiss businessman
 Fantasma d'amore (1981) as Conte Zighi
 Forget Mozart (1985) as Baron Gottfried van Swieten
  (1986) (scenes deleted)
 The Second Victory (1987) as Father Albertus
 Land der Väter, Land der Söhne (1988) as Bernauer (old)
 Dr. M (1990) as Kessler
 Aire Libre (1996) as Alexander von Humboldt (old) (final film role)

Selected television appearances
 The Rat Patrol (1966) as Gen. Ernest von Helmreich
  (1968, TV miniseries) as George Conway
  (1978) as Thurn
 Ike (1979) as Field Marshal Alfred Jodl
 The Winds of War (1983) as Field Marshal von Brauchitsch
 Albert Schweitzer (1987) as Albert Schweitzer (90 years old)
 War and Remembrance (1988) as Field Marshal Walther von Brauchitsch

External links 
 
 Obituary : The Independent
 

1910 births
2002 deaths
German male film actors
German male television actors
Actors from Nuremberg
People from the Kingdom of Bavaria
20th-century German male actors
German Film Award winners